The Gambia competed at the 2019 African Games held from 19 to 31 August 2019 in Rabat, Morocco. In total, athletes representing the country won two gold medals and one silver medal. The country finished in 19th place in the medal table.

Medal summary

Medal table 

|  style="text-align:left; width:78%; vertical-align:top;"|

|  style="text-align:left; width:22%; vertical-align:top;"|

3x3 basketball 

Awa Jawara, Aminata Jobe, Yassin Jaal Mboob and Adam Touray competed in 3x3 basketball in the women's tournament. The team reached the quarterfinals.

Athletics 

Gina Bass won the silver medal in the women's 100 metres event. She also won the gold medal in the women's 200 metres event.

Fatou Sanneh also competed in the women's 100 metres and women's 200 metres events. In both events she qualified in the heats to compete in the semifinals and in both events she did not qualify to compete in the final.

Ebrahima Camara, Adama Jammeh and Sengan Jobe competed in the men's 100 metres event. Jobe did not advance to compete in the semifinals. Jammeh reached the semifinals and Camara reached the final. Camara finished in 7th place in the final.

Judo 

Two athletes competed in judo: Adbdourahman Ceesay (men's −81 kg) and Omar Jobe (men's +100 kg). They were both eliminated in the first round.

Swimming 

Momodou Lamin Saine and Ebrima Sorry Buaro competed in swimming.

Saine competed in the men's 50 metres breaststroke event and in the men's 100 metre breaststroke event.

Buaro competed in the men's 50 metre freestyle event and in the men's 100 metre freestyle event.

Volleyball

Beach Volleyball 
Men

Sainey Jawo and Babou Jarra Mbye competed in beach volleyball and won the gold medal in the men's tournament.

References 

Nations at the 2019 African Games
2019
African Games